Jim Purtill (born November 5, 1955) is an American football coach. He is the offensive coordinator at Wesley College in Dover, Delaware, a position he has held since 2020. Purtill served as the head football coach at Salem University in Salem, West Virginia in 1982 and St. Norbert College in De Pere, Wisconsin from 1999 to 2013. He was the offensive coordinator and quarterbacks coach at Davenport University in Grand Rapids, Michigan from 2017 to 2019. Purtill graduated from Miami University in Oxford, Ohio in 1978.

Head coaching record

References

External links
 Wesley profile
 Davenport profile

1955 births
Living people
Albion Britons football coaches
Cornell Big Red football coaches
Davenport Panthers football coaches
Ferris State Bulldogs football coaches
Salem Tigers football coaches
St. Norbert Green Knights football coaches
Wesley Wolverines football coaches
Wisconsin–Oshkosh Titans football coaches
Miami University alumni
Salem International University alumni